Mataram (Indonesian: Kota Mataram) is a city and the capital of the Indonesian province of West Nusa Tenggara. The city is surrounded on all the landward sides by (but is not administratively contained within) West Lombok Regency and lies on the western side of the island of Lombok, Indonesia. It is also the largest city of the province, and had a population of 402,843 at the 2010 Census and 429,651 at the 2020 Census.

The city is an economic, cultural, and education center of the province. It hosts all public universities in the province, the main airport as well as the only international airport in the province, and also main government offices. Greater Mataram Area (Indonesian: Mataram Raya) or sometimes also called Gumi Rinjani Metropolitan Area is a metropolitan area surrounding the city with a total population of around 3 million people on 2015, making it one of the largest in Lesser Sunda Islands along with Denpasar metropolitan area in Bali.

History 

There was a small city called Selaparang in this area . It was the centre of the power in Lombok from 16th to 19th century A.D.

Geography

Governance

Administrative division 
The city consists of six districts (kecamatan), tabulated below with their areas and their populations at the 2010 Census and the 2020 Census. The table also includes the number of administrative villages (rural desa and urban kelurahan also called "kampungs") in each district, and its postal codes.

Demographics

Ethnicity 
The Sasak people are the indigenous people of Lombok and form the majority of Mataram's residents. Mataram is also home to people of Balinese, Javanese, Chinese, Tionghoa-Peranakan people of mixed Indonesian and Chinese descent and a small number of Arab Indonesian people, mainly of Yemeni descent who arrived when the city was known as "Ampenan".  Despite being urban dwellers, the Sasak people of Mataram still identify strongly with their origins and the Sasak culture.

Religion 
Islam is the religion of over 80% of the population of Mataram. Hinduism has the second largest following with 14% of the population. Other religions practised in Mataram are Christianity, Buddhism, and Confucianism.

Language 
Mataram society normally speaks the Sasak language, Bahasa Sasak, which is the native language of the indigenous people of Lombok. Indonesian is the language most widely used in formal business, education and government contexts. When at home or a place of recreation, Mataram residents tend to use the Mataram Sasak language.

Climate
Mataram has a tropical monsoon climate (Köppen Am) with heavy rainfall from November to March and moderate to little rainfall from April to October.

References

External links 

 
 

Populated places in Lombok
Provincial capitals in Indonesia
Geography of Lombok
Cities in Indonesia